The Čabranka is a small river on the border between Slovenia and Croatia. Its source is just west of the settlement of Podplanina in the Municipality of Loški Potok in southern Slovenia and just north of the Croatian village of Čabar, from which it gets its name. It joins the Kupa at Osilnica.

See also 
List of rivers of Slovenia

References

External links
Čabranka on Geopedia

Rivers of White Carniola
Rivers of Croatia
Croatia–Slovenia border
International rivers of Europe
Border rivers